The Monastery of Our Lady of Mount Carmel is a Catholic Christian monastery for Carmelite nuns that sits on the slope of Mount Carmel, in Haifa, Israel. The monastery is dedicated to Our Lady of Mount Carmel.

The community of Our Lady of Mount Carmel was founded in 1892 by a group of French Carmelite nuns. As of 2022, a community of about twenty sisters is made up of women from ten different countries and four different continents. The common language spoken inside the monastery is French.

The Monastery, which is exclusive to nuns, is located not far from the Stella Maris Monastery for Carmelite monks, also located on the slope of Mount Carmel in Haifa.

References 

Religious buildings and structures completed in 1936
Our Lady of Mount Carmel
1892 establishments
Haifa
Catholic Church in Israel
Carmelite monasteries in Israel